Canegrass, cane-grass or cane grass is a common name which may refer to the following plants in the family Poaceae:

 Eragrostis australasica – Swamp Canegrass
 Eragrostis infecunda – Southern Canegrass
 Zygochloa paradoxa – Sandhill Canegrass